Thermoniphas plurilimbata is a butterfly in the family Lycaenidae which is native to Africa.

It is found in the Republic of the Congo, the Democratic Republic of the Congo, Rwanda, Burundi, Uganda and Tanzania. The habitat consists of swampy areas in forests.

Subspecies
Thermoniphas plurilimbata plurilimbata (Congo, Uganda, north-western Tanzania, Democratic Republic of the Congo: Mongala, Uele, Ituri, Tshopo, Equateur, Kasai, Kwango, Sankuru and Lualaba)
Thermoniphas plurilimbata rutshurensis (Joicey & Talbot, 1921) (Democratic Republic of the Congo: east to North Kivu, Uganda: south-west to the Kigezi district, Rwanda, Burundi)

References

Thermoniphas
Butterflies of Africa
Lepidoptera of Burundi
Lepidoptera of the Democratic Republic of the Congo
Lepidoptera of the Republic of the Congo
Lepidoptera of Rwanda
Lepidoptera of Tanzania
Lepidoptera of Uganda
Butterflies described in 1895